Paracymoriza phlegetonalis is a moth in the family Crambidae. It was described by Snellen in 1895. It is found in India and on Java.

References

Acentropinae
Moths described in 1895